Luis Romero (1916–2009) was a Spanish novelist. He was born in Barcelona. He wrote two dozen books in a literary career spanning four decades. He won the Premio Nadal in 1951 for his novel La noria and the Premio Planeta in 1963 for El cacique. He wrote a well-received biography of the artist Salvador Dalí (Todo Dalí en un rostro, 1975). He also published a couple of histories of the Spanish Civil War, Tres días de julio in 1967, and Por qué y cómo mataron a Calvo Sotelo in 1982. The latter work won the Premio Espejo de España. Late in his career, he won the Ramon Llull Novel Award for his novel Castell de cartes.

References

1916 births
2009 deaths
20th-century Spanish novelists
21st-century Spanish novelists